French gray is a color in the color spectrum. It traditionally has a slightly warmer, more yellow tone than simple gray.

References

Shades of gray